Rebecca Belmore  D.F.A. (born 1960) is an interdisciplinary Anishinaabekwe artist who is notable for politically conscious and socially aware performance and installation work. She is Ojibwe and member of Obishikokaang (Lac Seul First Nation). Belmore currently lives in Toronto, Ontario.

Belmore has performed and exhibited nationally and internationally since 1986. Her work focuses on issues of place and identity, and confronts challenges for First Nations People.  Her work addresses history, voice and voicelessness, place, and identity. Her work, be it sculpture, video or photographic in nature, is performance-based. To address the politics of representation, Belmore's art strives to invert or subvert official narratives, while demonstrating a preference for the use of repetitive gesture and natural materials. Belmore's art reveals a long-standing commitment to politics and how they relate to the construction of identity and ideas of representation. She has exhibited across Canada, the US, Mexico, Cuba and Australia.

Life
Belmore was born on March 22, 1960 in Upsala, Ontario, Canada. Until the age of 16, Belmore spent her summers in Northwestern Ontario with her grandparents. During these summers, her grandmother taught her about harvesting native foods from the land. Author Jessica Bradley describes Belmore's adolescence as difficult due to "the custom ingrained through the [Canadian] government imposed assimilation, she was sent to attend high school in Thunder Bay and billeted with a non-Native family." Bradley adds that as a result of her experience as an adolescent, notions of displacement and cultural loss are "reformed into acts or objects of reparation and protest [within her various works]."
 Belmore attended the Ontario College of Art and Design in Toronto in 1988.

Belmore's mother was born on a small island in Northern Ontario and her journey to visit her mother's birthplace has had a significant impact on her work.

Career

Belmore has presented work in biennial exhibitions throughout her career. In 1991, she exhibited at the IV Bienal de la Habana, Havana, Cuba. She has twice represented Canada at the Sydney Biennale; in 1998 in the exhibition Every Day, and in 2006 in the exhibition Zones of Contact. In 2005 her work Fountain was shown at the Canadian Pavilion of the 51st Venice Biennale, as the first aboriginal artist ever to represent Canada at the event. In the same year she exhibited as part of Sweet Taboos at the 3rd Tirana Biennale, Tirana, Albania. 

Jolene Rickard's Venice Biennale Catalogue essay describes Belmore's work: 

Belmore has had two major solo touring exhibitions, The Named and the Unnamed, a multi-part installation that commemorates women missing from Vancouver's Downtown Eastside, at the Morris and Helen Belkin Art Gallery,  Vancouver (2002); and 33 Pieces, Blackwood Gallery, University of Toronto at Mississauga (2001). In 2008, the Vancouver Art Gallery hosted Rising to the Occasion, a mid-career survey of Belmore's artistic production. In 2014, Belmore was commissioned to create an original work for the Canadian Museum for Human Rights The work consists of a blanket of hand pressed clay beads, engaging the community in Winnipeg to help produce them.

In 2010, Belmore was involved in a legal dispute with the Pari Nadimi Gallery of Toronto, that sued her for punitive damages and for lost future revenues to $750,000.

In 2017, Belmore's work was exhibited at documenta 14 in Athens, Greece and in Kassel, Germany.

In 2018, the Art Gallery of Ontario staged a touring retrospective of Belmore's work, Facing the Monumental. Curated by Wanda Nanibush, Facing the Monumental incorporates sculptures, installations, photography and videos spanning 30 years of Belmore's career. It has been the largest exhibition of her work to date, and shown at galleries in Canada and the United States. 

Belmore participated in the 2022 Whitney Biennial in New York. Her sculptural installation ishkode (fire) (2021), a clay sculpture of a figure shrouded in a sleeping bag and surrounded by empty bullet shell casings, was included in the exhibition. Journalist Gabriella Angeleti described the piece 
in The Art Newspaper as "a critique of the historic genocide and ongoing disproportionate violence against Indigenous people," calling the work "a centerpiece" of the exhibition.

Artworks

Descriptions of important works 
Belmore's interactive installation Mawa-che-hitoowin: A Gathering of People for Any Purpose (1992), featured a circle of chairs from Belmore's kitchen and kitchen chairs owned by other women close to her, arranged in a circle. Each chair had a pair of headphones resting on it. Visitors were invited to sit in each chair, put on the headphones, and listen to the stories of the struggles and triumphs of different indigenous women in Canada, told in their own voices. The work was commissioned for an exhibition of Indigenous art on the 500th anniversary of Columbus's arrival in Hispaniola. As such, it used Indigenous traditions of storytelling and passing on wisdom from elders as a way to push back against Native stereotypes and victimization.

Select works 
 Twelve Angry Crinolines (1987), parade and video performance, Thunder Bay, Ontario, Canada. Collaboration with Ana Demetrakopoulos, Kim Erickson, Lori Gilbert, Joane Lachapelle-Bayak, Glenn McLeod, Karen Maki, Sandy Pandia and Lynne Sharman; organized by Lynne Sharman
 Artifact #671B (1988), protest in support of the Lubicon Cree and against the Olympic Flame celebrations, Thunder Bay, Ontario, Canada 
 High-tech Teepee Trauma Mama (1988), performance installation, Indian Days Native Student Association Winter Carnival, Lakehead University, Thunder Bay Ontario, Canada
 HOWUH! (1988), music based performance project with Allen De Leary, Definitely Superior Art Gallery and Thunder Bay Indian Friendship Centre, Thunder Bay, Ontario, Canada
 Nah-doe-tah-moe-win: Means an Object That You Listen To (1989), Niagara Artists Centre, Saint Catharines, Ontario, Canada; Galerie SAW Gallery, Ottawa, Ontario, Canada; Multi-media Works: A Native Perspective, AKA Gallery, Saskatoon, Saskatchewan, Canada
 August 29, 1990 (1990), performance, Première Biennale d'art actuel de Québec, Le Lieu, Quebec City, Quebec, Canada
 Ayum-ee-aawach Oomama-mowan: Speaking to Their Mother (1991), performance, Walter Phillips Gallery, The Banff Centre, Banff, Alberta, Canada; toured to numerous locations across Canada (1991-1996)
 Creation or Death: We Will Win (1991), performance, IV Bienal de la Habana, Havana, Cuba
Mawa-che-hitoowin: A Gathering of People for Any Purpose (1992), mixed-media installation, "Land/Spirit/Power" exhibition, National Gallery of Canada, Ottawa, Ontario, Canada
 I am not a Fucken Squaw! (1993), performance, Distance education program student graduation banquet, Sioux Lookout, Ontario, Canada
 Affiliation/Affliction (1994), collaboration with Reona Brass, Rencontre internationale d'art performance (RIAP) de Quebec, Le Lieu, Quebec, Canada
 Tourist Act #1 (1995), participatory performance, Institute of American Indian Arts, Santa Fe, New Mexico, U.S.A
 Interview with the Ghost of Luna (1997), performance, "Apocalypso" artist's residency, The Banff Centre, Banff, Alberta, Canada
 Garden of Eden (1998), performance, Five New Works (untitled), Canadian Performance Art Tour, Germany
 Manifesto (1999), performance, TIME TIME TIME performance art festival, Fado Performance, Inc.,  Zsa Zsa Gallery, Toronto, Ontario, Canada
 The Indian Factory (2000), performance making an installation, High-tech Storytellers: An Interdisciplinary Aboriginal Art Project, Tribe/AKA Gallery, Saskatoon, Saskatchewan, Canada
 Wild (2001), House Guests: Contemporary Artists in the Grange, Art Gallery of Ontario, Toronto, Ontario, Canada
 Vigil (2002), performance, Talking Stick Aboriginal Art Festival, Full Circle First Nations Performance, Vancouver, British Columbia, Canada
 Tongue River (2003), performance collaboration with Bently Spang, Fado Performance, Inc., Toronto, Ontario, Canada
 Back to the Garden (2006), performance, Urban Shaman/ Ace Art, Inc., Winnipeg, Manitoba, Canada 
 "Freeze" with Osvaldo Yero (2006), Nuit Blanche, Toronto, Ontario, Canada 
 Painted Road (2007), performance, gravel road behind the Art Gallery of Sudbury, Laurentian University, Sudbury, Ontario, Canada
 Making Always War (2008), performance, performance assistant: Daina Warren, Morris and Helen Belkin Art Gallery, University of British Columbia, Vancouver, British Columbia, Canada

Exhibitions

Select solo exhibitions 
 Artifact #671B (1988), Thunder Bay, Ontario, Canada
Crazy Old Woman Child (1988), Indian Friendship Centre, Thunder Bay, Ontario, Canada
I'm a High-Tech Teepee Trauma Mama (1988), Native Student Council, Lakehead University, Thunder Bay, Ontario, Canada
Mushkegokwe/Swampwoman (1988), Women Against Military Madness, Minneapolis, Minnesota, USA
Nah-doe-tah-moe-win (1989), Galerie Saw, Ottawa, Ontario, Canada
Ayumee-aawach Oomama-Mowan: Speaking to Their Mother with Marjorie Beaucage (1992), XYZ, Toronto, Ontario, Canada
Wana-na-wang-ong (1993), Contemporary Art Gallery, Vancouver, British Columbia, Canada
I Wait for the Sun (1994), Faret Tachikawa Art Project, Art Front Gallery, Tokyo, Japan
Tourist Act #1 (1995), Institute of American Indian Art, Santa Fe, New Mexico, USA
 Dreamers (1999), Keyano College Art Gallery, Fort McMurray, Alberta, Canada
 Many/One (1999), Optica, Montreal, Quebec, Canada
 on this ground (2000), Rhode Island School of Design Museum of Art, Providence, Rhode Island, USA
 Private Collection (2001), Pari Nadimi Gallery, Toronto, Ontario, Canada
 33 Pieces (2001), organized by Blackwood Gallery, University of Toronto at Mississauga, Mississauga, Ontario, Canada; toured to Dunlop Art Gallery, Regina, Saskatchewan, Canada (2002); Parry Sound Station Gallery, Parry Sound, Ontario, Canada (2002); Definitely Superior Gallery, Thunder Bay, Ontario, Canada (2003); W.K.P. Kennedy Public Art Gallery, Capitol Centre, North Bay, Ontario, Canada (2003) 
 The Named and the Unnamed (2002), organized by Morris and Helen Belkin Art Gallery, Vancouver, British Columbia, Canada; toured to Art Gallery of Ontario, Toronto, Ontario, Canada (2003); Kamloops Art Gallery, Kamloops, British Columbia, Canada (2004); Confederation Art Centre, Charlottetown, Prince Edward Island, Canada (2004); McMaster Museum of Art, McMaster University, Hamilton, Ontario, Canada (2006)
 Extreme (2003), Pari Nadimi Gallery, Toronto, Ontario, Canada
 Temperance (2004), Tribe, Saskatoon, Saskatchewan, Canada
 Untitled 1, 2, 3 (2005), grunt gallery, Vancouver, British Columbia, Canada
 The Capture of Mary March, Pari Nadimi Gallery, Toronto, Ontario, Canada`
 Parallel (2006), Urban Shaman/ Ace Art, Inc., Winnipeg, Manitoba, Canada
 cosi in cielo, cosi in terra (2006), Franco Soffiantino Arte Contemporanea, Turin, Italy
 Rebecca Belmore: Rising to the Occasion (2008), Vancouver Art Gallery, Vancouver, British Columbia, Canada
 March 5, 1819 (2008), The Rooms Provincial Art Gallery, St. Johns, Newfoundland, Canada
Rebecca Belmore: Facing the Monumental (2018), Art Gallery of Ontario, Toronto, Ontario, Canada

Selected group exhibitions 

 1988: Souvenir from the Northern Front, Mayworks, Toronto, Ontario, Canada
1988: See Jane Sew Strontium, Definitely Superior, Thunder Bay, Ontario, Canada
1988: The New Traditionalists, Definitely Superior, Thunder Bay, Ontario, Canada
1989: Changers: A Spiritual Renaissance, National Arts and Crafts Corporation, Ottawa, Ontario, Canada
1989: Broadcast, Definitely Superior, Thunder Bay, Ontario, Canada
1990: Biennale d'art actuel, Quebec City, Quebec, Canada
1990: Multi-Media Works: A Native Perspective, AKA, Saskatoon, Saskatchewan, Canada
1990: Telling Things, Art Metropole, Toronto, Ontario, Canada
1990: Young Contemporaries 90, London Regional Art Gallery, London, Ontario, Canada
1991: Bienal de la Habana, Havana, Cuba'
1991: Okanata, A Space, Toronto, Ontario, Canada
1991: Between Views, Walter Phillips Gallery, Banff, Alberta, Canada
1991: Interrogating Identity, Grey Art Gallery, New York, New York, USA'
1991: A Likeness, Agnes Etherington Art Centre, Kingston, Ontario, Canada
1992: Enduring Strength, Intermedia Arts and Two Rivers Gallery, Minneapolis, Minnesota, USA
1992: Land, Spirit, Power, National Gallery of Canada, Ottawa, Ontario, Canada
1992: Princesses, Indiennes, et Cowgirls: Stereotypes de la Frontiere, Oboro, Montreal, Quebec, Canada
1993: Stand, Erie, Pennsylvania, USA
1993: Margins of Memory, Art Gallery of Windsor, Windsor, Ontario, Canada
1994: Rencontre internationale d'art performance de Quebec, Le Lieu, Quebec City, Quebec, Canada
1994: Sixth Native American Fine Arts Invitational, The Heard Museum, Phoenix, Arizona, USA
1994: Faret Tachikawa Art Project, Tokyo, Japan
1995: Longing and Belonging: From the Faraway Nearby, Santa Fe, New Mexico, USA
1995: History 101: The Re-Search for Family, St. Louis, Missouri'
1996: Liaisons, The Power Plant, Toronto, Ontario, Canada
1996: Metissages, Galerie Optica, Montreal, Quebec, Canada
2012: Shapeshifting: Transformations in Native American Art, Peabody Essex Museum, Salem, Massachusetts, USA
2018-2019: Art for a New Understanding: Native Voices, 1950s to Now, Crystal Bridges Museum of American Art, Bentonville, Arkansas, USA
2019: Hearts of Our People: Native Women Artists, Minneapolis Institute of Art, Minneapolis, Minnesota, USA
2022: Quiet As Its Kept: Whitney Biennial, Whitney Museum, New York City, New York, USA

Awards, honours and residencies 
Belmore has been awarded membership in the Royal Canadian Academy of Arts. In 2004, Belmore completed a residency with MAWA (Mentoring Artists for Women's Art) in Winnipeg, Manitoba. In 2005, she won the Victor Martyn Lynch-Staunton Award from the Canada Council. and she was the first Indigenous woman representing Canada at the Venice Biennale. Also in 2005, OCAD University conferred an honorary doctorate on Belmore in recognition of her career. She is also a Governor General's Award in Visual and Media Arts (2013),as well as the recipient of the 2016 Gershon Iskowitz Prize and an honorary doctorate from Emily Carr University in 2018.

Bibliography 
Belmore, Rebecca . "Five Sisters." In Indian Princesses and Cowgirls: Stereotypes from the Frontier. Burgess, Marilyn and Guthrie Valaskakis, Gail, Montreal: Oboro, 1995.  

Blondeau, Lori, et al. "On the Fightin’ Side of Me: Lori Blondeau and Lynne Bell in conversation with Rebecca Belmore." Fuse Magazine, Vol. 28, No. 1. pp. 25–34.
Luna, James; Townsend-Gault, Charlotte (2003). Rebecca Belmore: The Named and the Unnamed. Morris and Helen Belkin Art Gallery, University of British Columbia. .
Bradley, Jessica. "Rebecca Belmore: Art and the Object of Performance." In Caught in the Act: An Anthology of Performance Art by Canadian Women. Tanya Mars and Johanna Householder, eds. Toronto: YYZ Books, 2004.
Bailey, Jann LM Bailey; Watson, Scott (2005). Rebecca Belmore: Fountain. Kamloops Art Gallery, Morris and Helen Belkin Art Gallery, University of British Columbia. .
Enright, Robert. “The Poetics of History: An Interview with Rebecca Belmore”, Border Crossings, Vol. 24, No. 3, 2005.
Burgess, Marilyn. "The Imagined Geographies of Rebecca Belmore." Parachute, No. 93, Jan/Feb/March, 1999. pp. 12–20.
Fisher, Barbara (2001). 33 Pieces. University of Toronto at Mississuaga, Blackwood Gallery. .
Hill, Richard William. "It’s Very Interesting if it Works: In Conversation with Rebecca Belmore and James Luna." Fuse Magazine, Vol. 24, No. 1, 2001. pp. 28–33.
 "Built on Running Water: Rebecca Belmore's Fountain." Fuse Magazine. Vol. 29, No. 1, 2006. pp. 49–51.
Martin, Lee-Anne. “The Waters of Venice: Rebecca Belmore at the 51st Biennale.” In Canadian Art, vol. 22, 2005.

Nanibush, Wanda (2018). Rebecca Belmore: Facing the Monumental. Toronto: Art Gallery of Ontario; Fredericton, Goose Lane Editions. .
Belmore, Florene ed. (2019). Wordless: The Performance Art of Rebecca Belmore Vancouver, Grunt Gallery; Whistler, Audain Art Museum. 
Ahlberg, Yohe J, and Teri Greeves. Hearts of Our People. Native Women Artists. Seattle: University of Washington Press, 2019. Print. http://www.worldcat.org/oclc/1105604814

Further reading

References 

 

Living people
Artists from Ontario
Artists from Vancouver
Canadian multimedia artists
Canadian contemporary artists
First Nations filmmakers
First Nations installation artists
Women installation artists
First Nations sculptors
First Nations performance artists
Members of the Royal Canadian Academy of Arts
Ojibwe people
1960 births
20th-century Canadian women artists
Governor General's Award in Visual and Media Arts winners
20th-century Canadian artists
21st-century Canadian women artists
21st-century Canadian artists
20th-century First Nations people
21st-century First Nations people
First Nations women
First Nations women artists